The Tenth Texas Legislature met from November 2, 1863 to November 15, 1864 in its regular session and two called sessions. All members of the House of Representatives and about half of the members of the Senate were elected in 1863.

Sessions
10th Regular session: November 2–December 16, 1863
10th First called session: May 9–28, 1864
10th Second called session: October 17–November 15, 1864

Party summary

Officers

Senate
 Lieutenant Governor Fletcher Summerfield Stockdale
 President pro tempore Robert Henry Guinn, Democrat

House of Representatives
 Speaker of the House  M. D. K. Taylor, Democrat

Members
Members of the Tenth Texas Legislature at the beginning of the regular session, November 2, 1863:

Senate

House of Representatives

 Marmion Henry Bowers
 John Thomas Brady
 Constantine W. Buckley
 Stephen Heard Darden
 Alfred Wesley De Berry
 George Washington Glasscock
 John Summerfield Griffith
 James Washington Guinn
 Hays
 John Leal Haynes
 Edward R. Hord
 William Hamilton Ledbetter
 Marshall
 James G. McDonald
 McGuire
 William Mynatt Peck
 Davis M. Prendergast
 John H. Prince
 LaFayette Robinson, District 57, Cameron, Milam County
 Hermann Seele
 William R. Shannon, Democrat
 Slaughter
 Simpson
 M. D. K. Taylor, Democrat
 Orville Thomas Tyler
 Way

Membership changes

Senate

 District 30: Knox was elected in special election held April 25, 1864.

House of Representatives

 District 42: Shannon was elected in special election held May 4, 1864.

External links

10 Texas Legislature
1863 in Texas
1864 in Texas
1863 U.S. legislative sessions
1864 U.S. legislative sessions